Brighton College Canadian career college with two campus locations in Burnaby, British Columbia, Crystal Mall Campus and Metropointe Campus. Accredited by PTIB and BC EQA, the college specializes in career training in business, AutoCAD, engineering, construction, information technology, international trade, accounting, office administration and hospitality.

History
Brighton College was established in the year 2000 under the name Vancouver Central College. At this time, the college offered programs in accounting, information technology and business administration. Since then, the college has added more programs to align with the job market demands in Canada. In 2011, Vancouver Central College re-branded to Brighton College.

Career Services
The career services department assists students inquiring about practicum and co-op opportunities at relevant companies for their work experience placement.

Programs
 AutoCAD Design and Drafting
 Architecture and Green Building Design
 Construction Supervision and Management
 Civil and Structural Engineering Technology
 Business Management
 Advanced Business Management Specialty
 Office Administration
 Hospitality Management
 Accounting Payroll Administration
 International Trade and Freight Forwarding
 Information Technology

Affiliations
 PTIB (Private Training Institutions Branch) – Designated Institution
 BC EQA (British Columbia Education Quality Assurance) – Designated Institution
 FITT (Forum for International Trade Training) – Platinum Accredited Partner
 CIFFA (Canadian International Freight Forwarders Association) – Certified Partner
 ASTTBC (Applied Science Technologists and Technicians of British Columbia) – Program Accreditation
 CPA (Canadian Payroll Association) – Certified Partner
 American Hotel & Lodging Educational Institute (AHLEI) – Academic Partner
 Microsoft IT Academy (ITA)

See also
 List of colleges in British Columbia
 List of colleges in Canada
 Higher education in Canada

References

External links
 Brighton College
 PTIB

Colleges in British Columbia